Mispila dotata is a species of beetle in the family Cerambycidae. It was described by Francis Polkinghorne Pascoe in 1864. It is known from Moluccas.

References

dotata
Beetles described in 1864